Li Zhengyu (born October 10, 1974 in Guilin, Guangxi) is a Chinese freestyle wrestler who competed at the 2004 Summer Olympics.

He finished fifth in the 55 kg freestyle competition.

External links
Profile on sports.yahoo.com

1974 births
Living people
Olympic wrestlers of China
Chinese male sport wrestlers
People from Guilin
Wrestlers at the 2004 Summer Olympics
Sportspeople from Guangxi